Chenghua may refer to:

Chenghua Emperor, Chinese emperor of the Ming dynasty
Chenghua District, district in Chengdu, Sichuan, China
Chenghua University, former university in Chengdu